The  Atlanta Falcons season was the franchise’s thirtieth season in the National Football League (NFL). The team finished with a 9–7 record, and qualified for the post-season as a wild card.

The Falcons’ pass defense gave up 4,541 yards through the air in 1995, which was a league record until 2011. The Falcons’ defense faced a total of 650 pass attempts, the most all time. The 405 passes completed against Atlanta in 1995 are fifth-most in NFL history. Still, Atlanta's points surrendered was 19th in the league, and its point-differential for the season was +13.

Falcons receivers Eric Metcalf, Bert Emanuel, and Terence Mathis became the third trio of teammates with over 1,000 receiving yards in the same season – a rare occurrence, with only five such trios in NFL history (as of 2021).

Offseason

NFL draft

Personnel

Roster

Regular season

Schedule

Standings

Playoffs

Notes

References

External links
 1995 Atlanta Falcons at Pro-Football-Reference.com

Atlanta Falcons
Atlanta Falcons seasons
Atlanta